Marcel Dionne (21 November 1931 – 3 March 1998) was a Liberal party member of the House of Commons of Canada. He was born in Saint-Victor-de-Tring, Quebec and became a businessman by career.

He won the Chicoutimi electoral district in the 1979 federal election and was re-elected there in 1980. Dionne was defeated in the 1984 election by André Harvey of the Progressive Conservative party. He served in the 31st and 32nd Canadian Parliaments.

Dionne died on 3 March 1998 following a heart attack.

References

External links
 

1931 births
1998 deaths
Members of the House of Commons of Canada from Quebec
Liberal Party of Canada MPs
People from Chaudière-Appalaches
Politicians from Saguenay, Quebec